The 1994–95 Umaglesi Liga was the sixth season of top-tier football in Georgia. It began on 14 August 1994 and ended on 31 May 1995. Dinamo Tbilisi were the defending champions.

Locations

League standings

Results

Top goalscorers

See also
1994–95 Pirveli Liga
1994–95 Georgian Cup

References
Georgia - List of final tables (RSSSF)

Erovnuli Liga seasons
1
Georgia